Lexington Brewing and Distilling Company is a brewery and distillery based in Lexington, Kentucky founded in 1999 by Pearse Lyons, the president and founder of animal nutrition company Alltech.

Alltech entered the beverage industry with the introduction of their Kentucky Ale. In 2012 the company opened its distillery and developed a line of spirits including Pearse Lyons Reserve, a malt whiskey, Bluegrass Sundown, a bourbon-infused coffee drink, and Town Branch Bourbon.

Beers

Spirits
The Lexington Brewing and Distilling Company also produces four whiskey spirits:

 Town Branch Bourbon - aged in new, charred white oak barrels - 90 proof
 Town Branch Rye - 100 proof
 Pearse Lyons Reserve (malt whiskey) - aged in spent bourbon barrels that have also been used to age the brewery's flagship Kentucky Bourbon Barrel Ale - 80 proof
 Bluegrass Sundown  - a dark roasted coffee infused with Kentucky bourbon and sugar

The distillery began making spirits in 2007, and began selling them in 2011 after waiting for four years of aging.

In 2015, the distillery released its first specialty spirit, a 6-year single barrel version of its Town Branch Bourbon.

Tours

With its inception, the Town Branch Distillery was added to the Kentucky Bourbon Trail and began offering tours. Visitors are able to view the alcohol production process and sample beer and spirits.

References

External links
Official site

Companies based in Lexington, Kentucky
Beer brewing companies based in Kentucky
Food and drink companies established in 1999
1999 establishments in Kentucky